Lightner is a surname. Notable people with the surname include:

Candy Lightner (born 1946), organizer and founding president of Mothers Against Drunk Drivers
Clarence Lightner (1921–2002), first popularly elected mayor of Raleigh, North Carolina, and first African-American elected mayor of a Southern city of over 50,000 residents
Mary Elizabeth Rollins Lightner (1818–1913), Mormon pioneer
Sarah Lightner, Michigan politician
Sherri Lightner (born 1950), California politician
Theodore Lightner (died 1981), American bridge player
Winnie Lightner (1899–1971), American film actress

Fictional characters:
Violet Lightner, better known as Armory (comics), in the Marvel Comic universe

See also
Lightner Witmer (1867–1956), American psychologist credited with introducing the term "clinical psychology"
Lightner double, a conventional double in the game of bridge

Surnames
English-language surnames
Surnames of English origin
Surnames of British Isles origin